The 1960 Pittsburgh Steelers season was the franchise's 28th in the National Football League.  They compiled a 5–6–1 record and a fifth-place finish under head coach Buddy Parker while playing their home games at Forbes Field.

Preseason

Among the Steelers' preseason games in 1960 was an exhibition match with the Toronto Argonauts of the Canadian Football League; the Steelers won handily, 43–16. Forty-eight years later, the Steelers will return to Toronto to face the Buffalo Bills as the first game in the Toronto Series.

Regular season

Schedule

 Saturday night (September 24)

Game summaries

Week 1 (Saturday September 24, 1960): Dallas Cowboys 

at Cotton Bowl, Dallas, Texas

 Game time: 
 Game weather: 
 Game attendance: 30,000
 Referee: 
 TV announcers:
 Dallas – Doran 75 pass from LeBaron (Cone kick)
 Dallas – Dugan 7 pass from Lebaron (Cone kick)
 Pittsburgh – Carpenter 28 pass from Layne (Layne kick)
 Dallas – McIlhenny 5 run  (Cone kick)
 Pittsburgh – Orr 6 pass from Layne (Layne kick)
 Pittsburgh – Dial 70 pass from Tracy (Layne kick)
 Dallas – Doran 54 pass from LeBaron (Cone kick)
 Pittsburgh – Carpenter 49 pass from Layne (Layne kick)
 Pittsburgh – Tracy 65 pass from Layne (Layne kick)

Scoring Drives:

Week 2 (Sunday October 2, 1960): Cleveland Browns  

at Cleveland Municipal Stadium, Cleveland, Ohio

 Game time: 
 Game weather: 
 Game attendance: 67,692
 Referee: 
 TV announcers:

Scoring Drives:

 Cleveland – Plum 1 run (Baker kick)
 Cleveland – Mitchell 5 run (Baker kick)
 Cleveland – Kreitling 60 pass from Plum (Baker kick)
 Pittsburgh – Tracy 40 pass from Layne (Layne kick)
 Pittsburgh – Tracy 1 run (kick failed)
 Cleveland – Brown 2 run (Baker kick)
 Pittsburgh – Dial 3 pass from Layne (Rechichar kick)

Week 3 (Sunday October 9, 1960): New York Giants  

at Forbes Field, Pittsburgh, Pennsylvania

 Game time: 
 Game weather: 
 Game attendance: 40,323
 Referee: 
 TV announcers:

Scoring Drives:

 Pittsburgh – Orr 22 pass from Tracy (Rechichar kick)
 New York Giants – FG Summerall 41
 New York Giants – Safety, Johnson tackled in end zone by Grier
 New York Giants – Rote 9 pass from Shaw (Summerall kick)
 Pittsburgh – Dial 30 pass from Layne (Rechichar kick)
 Pittsburgh – FG Rechichar 11
 New York Giants – Gifford 44 pass from Conerly (Summerall kick)

Week 4 (Sunday October 16, 1960): St. Louis Cardinals  

at Forbes Field, Pittsburgh, Pennsylvania

 Game time: 
 Game weather: 
 Game attendance: 22,971
 Referee: 
 TV announcers:

Scoring Drives:

 Pittsburgh – FG Rechichar 42
 Pittsburgh – FG Rechichar 31
 Pittsburgh – Tracy 4 run (Rechichar kick)
 Pittsburgh – Dial 26 pass from Layne (Rechichar kick)
 St. Louis – Crow 6 run (Conrad kick)
 St. Louis – Mestnik 2 run (Conrad kick)
 Pittsburgh – Orr 51 pass from Tracy (Rechichar kick)

Week 5 (Sunday October 23, 1960): Washington Redskins  

at Griffith Stadium, Washington, DC

 Game time: 
 Game weather: 
 Game attendance: 25,292
 Referee: 
 TV announcers:

Scoring Drives:

 Washington – Olszewski 1 run (Khayat kick)
 Pittsburgh – Tracy 5 pass from Bukich (Layne kick)
 Washington – FG Khayat 15
 Pittsburgh – FG Layne 17
 Pittsburgh – Lewis recovered fumble in end zone (Layne kick)
 Washington – Walton 35 pass from Guglielmi (Khayat kick)
 Washington – Anderson 12 pass from Guglielmi (Khayat kick)
 Pittsburgh – FG Layne 15
 Pittsburgh – Dial 27 pass from Bukich (Layne kick)
 Washington – FG Khayat 43

Week 6 (Sunday October 30, 1960): Green Bay Packers  

at Forbes Field, Pittsburgh, Pennsylvania

 Game time: 
 Game weather: 
 Game attendance: 30,155
 Referee: 
 TV announcers:

Scoring Drives:

 Green Bay – FG Hornung 35
 Green Bay – FG Hornung 35
 Green Bay – FG Hornung 45
 Green Bay – FG Hornung 17
 Pittsburgh – Tracy 37 pass from Layne (Layne kick)
 Pittsburgh – Dial 48 pass from Layne (pass failed)
 Green Bay – Taylor 1 run (Hornung kick)

Week 7 (Sunday November 6, 1960): Philadelphia Eagles  

at Franklin Field, Philadelphia, Pennsylvania

 Game time: 
 Game weather: 
 Game attendance: 58,324
 Referee: John Pace
 TV announcers:

Scoring Drives:

 Philadelphia – Barnes 9 run (Walston kick)
 Philadelphia – McDonald 24 pass from Van Brocklin (Walston kick)
 Philadelphia – FG Walston 21
 Philadelphia – McDonald 39 pass from Van Brocklin (Walston kick)
 Philadelphia – FG Walston 11
 Pittsburgh – Dial 50 pass from Tracy (Layne kick)
 Philadelphia – McDonald 26 pass from Van Brocklin (Walston kick)

Week 8 (Sunday November 13, 1960): New York Giants  

at Yankee Stadium, Bronx, New York

 Game time: 
 Game weather: 
 Game attendance: 63,321
 Referee: 
 TV announcers:

Scoring Drives:

 Pittsburgh – Layne 1 run (Layne kick)
 Pittsburgh – Tracy 1 run (Layne kick)
 New York Giants – Gifford 6 run (Summerall kick)
 Pittsburgh – FG Layne 10
 Pittsburgh – Dial 7 pass from Layne (Layne kick)
 New York Giants – Gifford 57 pass from Conerly (Summerall kick)
 New York Giants – FG Summerall 43
 New York Giants – Gifford 27 pass from Conerly (Summerall kick)
 New York Giants – FG Summerall 37

Week 9 (Sunday November 20, 1960): Cleveland Browns  

at Forbes Field, Pittsburgh, Pennsylvania

 Game time: 
 Game weather: 
 Game attendance: 35,215
 Referee: 
 TV announcers:

Scoring Drives:

 Pittsburgh – Johnson 3 run (Layne kick)
 Cleveland – FG Baker 19
 Cleveland Kreitling 6 pass from Plum (Baker kick)
 Pittsburgh – Tracy 4 run (Layne kick)

Week 10 (Sunday November 27, 1960): Washington Redskins  

at Forbes Field, Pittsburgh, Pennsylvania

 Game time: 
 Game weather: 
 Game attendance: 22,234
 Referee: 
 TV announcers:

Scoring Drives:

 Pittsburgh – FG Tracy 37
 Pittsburgh – FG Tracy 31
 Pittsburgh – Tracy 28 run (Layne kick)
 Washington – James 49 pass from Guolielmi (Khayat kick)
 Pittsburgh – FG Layne 23
 Washington – FG Khayat 9
 Pittsburgh – FG Tracy 28
 Pittsburgh – FG Layne 11

Week 12 (Sunday December 11, 1960): Philadelphia Eagles  

at Forbes Field, Pittsburgh, Pennsylvania

 Game time: 
 Game weather: 
 Game attendance: 22,101
 Referee: 
 TV announcers:

Scoring Drives:

 Pittsburgh – Layne 6 run (Layne kick)
 Pittsburgh – Johnson 7 pass from Layne (kick failed)
 Pittsburgh – Johnson 87 run (Layne kick)
 Pittsburgh – Dial 15 pass from Johnson (Layne kick)
 Philadelphia – Brown 53 pass from Jurgensen (Walston kick)
 Philadelphia – Brown 7 run (Walston kick)
 Philadelphia – McDonald 19 pass from Jurgensen (Walston kick)

Week 13 (Sunday December 18, 1960): St. Louis Cardinals  

at Busch Stadium I, St. Louis, Missouri

 Game time: 
 Game weather: 
 Game attendance: 20,840
 Referee: 
 TV announcers:

Scoring Drives:

 St. Louis – Mestnik 1 run (Perry kick)
 Pittsburgh – Orr 49 pass from Layne (Layne kick)
 St. Louis – FG Perry 16
 St. Louis – Randle 14 pass from Roach (Perry kick)
 St. Louis – Randle 8 pass from Roach (Perry kick)
 St. Louis – Roach 1 run (Perry kick)
 St. Louis – Randle 33 pass from Roach (Perry kick)

Standings

Roster

References

External links 
 1960 Pittsburgh Steelers at Pro-Football-Reference.com
 1960 Pittsburgh Steelers Highlights at youtube.com

Pittsburgh Steelers seasons
Pittsburgh Steelers
Pittsburgh Steel